Sage 300 is the name for the mid-market line of enterprise management and accounting applications (formerly Sage ACCPAC), primarily serving small and medium-sized businesses. Since 2004, Sage 300 is developed by Sage. In 2012, Sage renamed ACCPAC to Sage 300.

Features

Sage 300 is a Windows based range of ERP software, running on Microsoft SQL. This can run under a Windows environment and has an option of being hosted by Sage. 
Sage 300 is a modular system with the following core suite of modules. The full list of modules developed in the Sage 300 API is also available.

Financials suite

 General ledger
 Bank services
 Tax services
 Accounts payable
 Accounts receivable
 Multi-company

Operations suite

 Inventory control
 Purchase orders
 (Sales) Order Entry

Payroll

 US and Canadian payroll

Core options

 Multi-currency 
 Project and job costing
 Transaction analysis and optional fields

It is multi-user, multi-currency, and multi-language. It is available in six languages: English, Spanish, French, Italian and Chinese (Simplified and Traditional).

History

The original product, EasyBusiness Systems, was developed for the CP/M operating system in 1976 by Don Thompson, Ted Comfoltey, Keith Wales, and Norm Francis of Basic Software Group and distributed by Information Unlimited Software. This was ported to MS-DOS and the IBM-PC in 1983.

Computer Associates acquired Information Unlimited Software in 1983 and ran it as an independent business unit. Easy Business Systems added payroll processing in 1984 and supported multiuser networking at this time. In 1987, it implemented a multi-window interface to allow moving between different modules. Easy Business Systems was renamed Accpac Plus in 1987 with the release of version 5. Accpac became popular in Canada with support of Canadian public accounting firms that would sell and support the software. The name Accpac is an acronym for 'A Complete and Comprehensive Program for Accounting Control'.

The first Windows version, CA-Accpac/2000, popularly known as ACCPAC for Windows, was developed in the early 1990s and released in October 1994. The Windows version marked the move to client/server and was developed with all new code in COBOL with Computer Associates development tools (these components were redeveloped in 2001 in Accpac Advantage Series with a core business layer developed in C and a user interface layer developed in Visual Basic).

In October 1996 ACCPAC for Windows 2.0 was released. In August 2001, the company presented ACCPAC Advantage Series 5.0, its first web-based version. The web interface was rebuilt in Sage 300 2016 for cross browser support, running on IIS with ASP.Net, a web API was added in the 2017.

Sage 300 initially ran on Btrieve Databases and then supported  a variety of database backends. Since Sage 300 2016 only the MS SQL database is supported.

Sage Software acquired Accpac from Computer Associates in 2004. Sage renamed it Sage Accpac ERP in 2006, then Sage ERP Accpac in 2009. Sage dropped the Accpac name in 2012 when it was renamed to Sage 300 ERP.

Sage 300 is no longer available for purchase in the UK, but is still available in other markets around the world.

Branding, editions and versions

See also 

Comparison of accounting software
Sage Group

References

External links 

 The Sage 300 ERP Web Site

Accounting software
Software companies of Canada
Financial software companies
300